DXJT-TV was a commercial television relay station owned by ABS-CBN Corporation. Its studio was located at Brgy. Don Enrique Lopez, Mati City, Davao Oriental.

ABS-CBN TV-28 Mati programs
TV Patrol Southern Mindanao

See also
 List of ABS-CBN Corporation channels and stations
 DXAS-TV

Television stations in Davao Oriental
Television channels and stations established in 2010
ABS-CBN stations